El Sena is a village in the Madre de Dios Province, in the Pando Department of Bolivia. It is the capital of El Sena Municipality.

References

External links 

Populated places in Pando Department